The Beauty of the Moment is a 2019 novel written by Tanaz Bhathena. The novel was nominated for the 2020 White Pine Award.

Plot summary  
Susan Thomas has emigrated from Jeddah, Saudi Arabia, and has recently moved to Mississauga, Ontario. Susan is passionate about art, but she knows that her parents expect her to pursue a career as a doctor or an engineer and that they would not allow her to attend art school.

Reception  
The book has been reviewed by The Globe and Mail, Kirkus Reviews, and Quill & Quire.

See also  
 A Girl Like That (novel)
 Hunted by the Sky

References

External links  

2019 Canadian novels
Novels set in Ontario
Mississauga in fiction
Canadian young adult novels
Books by Tanaz Bhathena
Farrar, Straus and Giroux books